Opatovec is a municipality and village in Svitavy District in the Pardubice Region of the Czech Republic. It has about 700 inhabitants.

Geography
It lies in the Svitavy Uplands. There are two major ponds in the municipality, Sychrovec and Pařez, fed by the Mikulečský Stream.

History
The first written mention of Opatovec is from 1347. In 1697, the municipality of Opatovec was created by merger of Opatovec with small hamlets of Košíře, Český Lačnov and Starý Valdek.

Sights
The Chapel of Saint Wenceslaus is the landmark of Opatovec. It was built in the Baroque style in 1850. In Košíře, there is the Church of the Nativity of the Virgin Mary from 1793.

References

External links

Villages in Svitavy District